Lewis Bigelow (August 18, 1785 – October 2, 1838) was a U.S. Representative from Massachusetts.

Born in Petersham, Massachusetts, Bigelow graduated from Williams College, Williamstown, Massachusetts, in 1803. He was admitted to the bar and commenced practice in Petersham. He served as member of the State senate 1819–1821. He was editor of the first seventeen volumes of Massachusetts Reports and of a digest of six volumes of Pickering's Reports.

Bigelow was elected as a Federalist to the Seventeenth Congress (March 4, 1821 – March 4, 1823). He moved to Peoria, Illinois, in 1831 and continued the practice of law. He was interested in the real estate business and in the operation of ferry boats. He served as Justice of the Peace. He was appointed clerk of the circuit court of Peoria County, November 26, 1835, and served until his death in Peoria, Illinois, October 2, 1838.

References

1785 births
1838 deaths
People from Petersham, Massachusetts
Williams College alumni
Politicians from Peoria, Illinois
Federalist Party members of the United States House of Representatives from Massachusetts
19th-century American politicians